Sally Hart may refer to:

Sally Hart (Family Affairs), fictional character from British soap Family Affairs
Sally-Ann Hart, British Conservative Party politician

See also
Sarah Hart (disambiguation)